Brenda Curtis is an old-time radio soap opera in the United States. It was broadcast on CBS September 11, 1939 - January 19, 1940.

Premise
The A to Z of American Radio Soap Operas, by Jim Cox, summarized the plot line of the program as follows: "Brenda Curtis was a promising actress who relinquished her career to be a homemaker in New York City. Domestic troubles included the downturn of her husband Jim's law practice." The couple had been married five years and had a 4-year-old daughter.

The 15-minute program was heard on weekdays and was sponsored by Campbell Soups.

Personnel
Characters in Brenda Curtis and the actors who portrayed them are shown in the table below.

Source: Radio Programs, 1924-1984: A Catalog of More Than 1800 Shows except as noted.

Ken Roberts was the announcer. Lew White and George Heninger provided the music. Lee Gebhart was the writer, and Diana Bourbon was the producer.

References 
 

1939 radio programme debuts
1940 radio programme endings
CBS Radio programs
American radio soap operas